The Punjab Anand Karaj Bill 2017 is a bill unanimously passed by the Provincial Assembly of the Punjab to legalise the status of Sikh marriages in the province. The bill was introduced by Ramesh Singh Arora in 2017.

References 

Acts of the Provincial Assembly of the Punjab
Sikhism in Pakistan
2017 in Pakistan
2017 in law